The E. C. Love House is a historic home in Quincy, Florida, United States. It is located at 219 North Jackson Street. On December 30, 1974, it was added to the U.S. National Register of Historic Places.

References

External links
 Gadsden County listings at National Register of Historic Places
 Gadsden County listings at Florida's Office of Cultural and Historical Programs

Houses in Gadsden County, Florida
Houses on the National Register of Historic Places in Florida
National Register of Historic Places in Gadsden County, Florida
1850 establishments in Florida
Houses completed in 1850